Regnault may refer to:

 Regnault (crater), a crater on the Moon
 French submarine Regnault (Q113), a Lagrange-class submarine built for the French Navy
 Lycée Regnault, a school in Tangier, Morocco

People with the surname
 Alice Regnault (1849–1931), French actress
 Antoine Régnault (16th c.), French merchant and bourgeois
 Étienne Regnault (d. 1688), the first governor of Réunion
 Félix Regnault (1863–1938), French physician, anthropologist and prehistorian
 François Regnault (born 1938), French philosopher, playwright and dramaturg
 Henri Regnault, (1843–1871), French painter 
 Henri Victor Regnault (1810–1878), French scientist, father of Henri Regnault
 Jean-Baptiste Regnault (1754–1829), French painter
 Jules Regnault (1834–1894), French economist
 Kyle Regnault (born 1988), American baseball player
 Patrick Regnault (born 1974), French football goalkeeper
 Valère Regnault (1545–1623), French Jesuit theologian

See also
 Renaud (disambiguation)
 Renault (disambiguation)
 Reynard (disambiguation)

French-language surnames